Bangi may refer to:
Bangi (surname), an Indian surname
Bangi, Afghanistan
Bangi, Iran (disambiguation)
Bangi, Nepal
Bangi, Malaysia
 Bangi Komuter station, Malaysia
 Bandar Baru Bangi, Malaysia
 Bangi (federal constituency), a federal constituency in Selangor, Malaysia
Bangi Station on the Seoul Subway in Seoul, South Korea
Bangui, Central African Republic